Pyrgetos is a village in the Larissa regional unit, Thessaly, Greece. It was the seat of the former municipality of Kato Olympos, which has been part of the municipality of Tempi since 2011. Its elevation is 140 m. In 2011 its population was 1,463. It is located on the southeastern slopes of Mount Olympus, 4 km east of Rapsani, 34 km northeast of Larissa and 40 km south of Katerini. It is situated near the Delta of Pineios, which is a protected area, part of the Natura 2000 network. Remains of a Venetian bridge are situated at the place Leivadi.

References

External links
Official website of the village
Larissa - Pyrgetos 

Populated places in Larissa (regional unit)